Girder is a DC Comics supervillain and a new Rogue to the Flash (Wally West). He first appeared in Flash: Iron Heights (2001) and was created by Geoff Johns and Ethan Van Sciver.

Girder made his live-action debut on the first season of The Flash, portrayed by Greg Finley.

Fictional character biography 
Steelworker Tony Woodward caused a riot at a steel plant after he assaulted a female employee. Angry coworkers threw Tony into a vat of molten steel. The liquid steel included recycled scraps from experiments performed by S.T.A.R. Labs. These scraps somehow turned Tony's body into living metal, which has incredible resistance from harm and grants him superhuman strength. The major drawback was that the steel body began to rust when exposed to oxygen. He was eventually arrested for robbery and sent to Iron Heights.

After escaping Iron Heights, he joined up with Blacksmith and her Rogues to take over Keystone City and Central City. While a member of her Rogues, Magenta used her powers to keep Girder from rusting and Girder, having an "attraction", made unwanted advances towards her. After making another crude pass, Magenta ripped Girder in half. His body was welded back together and Girder was taken back to Iron Heights.

During the Infinite Crisis, Girder was part of the Secret Society of Super Villains led by Alexander Luthor, Jr. (who was posing as Lex Luthor).

One Year Later, Girder was seen fighting the Teen Titans, but was defeated. He was later seen in Salvation Run.

In the DC Special: Cyborg mini-series, Girder has joined The Cyborg Revenge Squad.

Girder was among the villains in the ambush of the Justice Society of America led by Tapeworm.

While Girder is in custody at Iron Heights Penitentiary, he is broken out by Captain Boomerang to distract the guards so Captain Boomerang can sneak in to meet with Professor Zoom.

Powers and abilities 
Girder has superhuman strength and endurance. His body is made from a nearly indestructible steel that provides a high degree of protection from physical and energy attacks.

In other media

Television 
Tony Woodward appears in The Flash, portrayed by Greg Finley. This version was a childhood bully to Barry Allen and Iris West who became a metahuman with the ability to turn his skin into steel after falling into a vat of molten steel when the S.T.A.R. Labs particle accelerator exploded. In the episode "The Flash is Born", Woodward kidnaps West to force her to write about him defeating the Flash, who eventually defeats him with a supersonic punch. In "Power Outage", Woodward is released to fight Farooq Gibran / Blackout while Allen was temporarily depowered, only to be killed. In the episodes "Rupture" and "The Runaway Dinosaur", Team Flash reactivates the particle accelerator to give Allen his speed back, but their efforts inadvertently turn Woodward into a reanimated corpse. Once he returns from the Speed Force, Allen defeats him once more.

Film 
Girder makes a non-speaking cameo appearance in Superman/Batman: Public Enemies.

Miscellaneous 
 Girder appears in Justice League Unlimited #16. He escapes from Iron Heights Penitentiary to visit his family during Christmas, but runs afoul of Atom Smasher. Eventually, after discovering why Girder broke out, Atom Smasher arranges to have his family come and visit him in prison.
 Girder will appear in The Flash: The Fastest Man Alive #1.

References

External links 
Hyperborea article on Girder
Crimson Lightning  – An online index to the comic book adventures of the Flash.

DC Comics supervillains
DC Comics male supervillains
DC Comics cyborgs
DC Comics characters with superhuman strength
Comics characters introduced in 2001
Characters created by Geoff Johns